Brook Road Academy was a private school in Richmond, Virginia, United States.

History
It was established in 2000. In 2022 the school closed down.

References

Private high schools in Virginia
Educational institutions established in 2000
Schools in Richmond, Virginia
High schools in Richmond, Virginia
Private middle schools in Virginia
2000 establishments in Virginia